Villieu-Loyes-Mollon is a commune in the Ain department in eastern France.

It lies between Meximieux and Pont-d'Ain.

Villieu-Loyes-Mollon is the result of the merger of three former communes Villieu, Loyes and Mollon in 1974.

Population

Twin cities
  Dobřichovice, Czech Republic

See also
Communes of the Ain department

References

Communes of Ain
Ain communes articles needing translation from French Wikipedia